Pseudo-Apuleius is the name given in modern scholarship to the author of a 4th-century herbal known as Pseudo-Apuleius Herbarius or Herbarium Apuleii Platonici. The author of the text apparently wished readers to think that it was by Apuleius of Madaura (124–170 CE), the Roman poet and philosopher, but modern scholars do not believe this attribution. Little or nothing else is known of Pseudo-Apuleius apart from this.

The oldest surviving manuscript of the Herbarium is the 6th-century Leiden, MS. Voss. Q.9. Until the 12th century it was the most influential herbal in Europe, with numerous extant copies surviving into the modern era, along with several copies of an Old English translation. Thereafter, it was more or less displaced by the Circa instans, a herbal produced at the school of Salerno. "Pseudo-Apuleius" is also used as a shorthand generic term to refer to the manuscripts and derived works.

Pseudo-Apuleius Herbarius

Illustrations

Text 
The text of Pseudo-Apuleius Herbarius is based on late antique sources, especially Pliny's Historia naturalis and Discorides's De materia medica. Scholars agree that it was compiled in the 4th century, according to Sigerist (1930, p. 200) from Latin, according to Singer (1927, p. 37) from Greek sources. Each of the 128 to 131 chapters (the number varying between manuscripts) deals with one medical plant. In these chapters the name of the plant is followed by the enumeration of indications in the form of recipes and by synonyms of the plant's name.
 
For example: Chapter 89, Herba millefolium (Edition of Howald/Sigerist 1927):

Associated texts
In the surviving codices the Pseudo-Apuleius Herbarius was combined with other treatises: 
. Treatise dealing with the herb Stachys officinalis. It was falsely ascribed to Antonius Musa, physician of  the Roman emperor Augustus.
.
. Anonymous treatise on the use of the European badger in medicine.
 ascribed to an unknown Roman physician named "Sextus Placitus Papyriensis".
A-version with 12 chapters about quadrupeds.
B-version with 31 chapters about quadrupeds, birds, reptiles, spiders, insects and humans. 
. According to Riddle written before the 6th century in South-Europe.

Manuscripts 

Howald and Sigerist (edition 1927, V–XVI) divided the codices into 3 classes (α, β and γ) according to the varying mixture of associated texts in the codices: 
α-class containing parts 1, 2, 3, 4a and 5, moreover better synonyms than in the β-class-texts and no interpolations. The α-class is considered to be the class with the best text-tradition.
β-class containing parts 1, 2, 3, 4b, 5 and 6, moreover interpolations. The ß-class is considered to be the class with the best illustrations.
γ-class containing parts 1, 2 and 6, without the interpolations of the β-class. γ-class contains the oldest manuscripts.

Singer (1927), Grape-Albers (1977, pp. 2–5) and Collins (2000) cited more manuscripts: 
St. Gallen, Stiftsbibliothek, Cod. 217, 9th century.
London, British Library, Harley MS 585, 11th – 12th century.
London, British Library, Harley MS 1585, 12th century.
London, British Library, Harley MS 5294, 12th century.
London, British Library, Harley MS 6258 B, 12th century.
London, British Library, Sloane MS 1975, 12th century.
Oxford, Bodleian Library, MS. Ashmole 1431, 11th century.
Oxford, Bodleian Library, MS. Ashmole 1462, 12th century.
Turin, Bibliotheca Universitaria, MS. K IV 3, 11th century, destroyed by fire.

Several more manuscripts can be added (see Mylène Pradel-Baquerre 2013 and Claudine 
Chavannes-Mazel 2016):
 Leiden, University Library, MS BPL 1283, c 1300 (related to Lucca)
 Leiden, University Library, MS Voss.Lat.Qu. 13, 10th century (Anglo-Saxon group)
 Leiden, University Library, MS Voss.Lat.Qu. 40, 11th century (German group)
 Montpellier, Bibliothèque de l'Ecole de Médecine, MS 277, 15th century
 The Hague, Museum Meermanno-Westreenianum MS 10 D 7, 10th century (alpha group)

Translation: the Old English Herbarium 

A version of the Pseudo-Apuleius Herbarius was translated into Old English, surviving now in four manuscripts:

 London, British Library, Cotton MS Vitellius C. iii (illustrated)
 Oxford, Bodleian Library, MS. Hatton 76
 London, British Library, Harley MS 585
 London, British Library, Harley MS 6258 B (updated into early Middle English)

Like many of the Latin manuscripts, it includes the Herbarium of Pseudo-Apuleius, De herba vetonica, De taxone, medicina de quadrupedibus, and the Liber medicinae ex herbis feminis. It was first edited and translated by Oswald Cockayne, re-edited in 1984 by Jan de Vriend, and re-translated in 2002 by Anne Van Arsdall. A variety of dates and places have been suggested for the production of this translation, ranging from eighth-century Northumbria to late-tenth-century Winchester, with recent scholarship tending towards tenth-century Wessex.

Incunabula and early printings 
Based on a 9th-century manuscript of Monte Cassino the first incunable of Pseudo-Apuleius Herbarius was printed in Rome in 1481.

The first printing in northern Europe was done in 1537 in Zürich.

Editions 

de Vriend, Hubert Jan (ed.), The Old English Herbarium and Medicina de Quadrupedibus, The Early English Text Society, 286 (London: Oxford University Press, 1984). (Contains a Latin text alongside the Old English.)
 Kai Brodersen (2015). Apuleius, Heilkräuterbuch / Herbarius, Latin and German. Marix, Wiesbaden.

Sources

References

External links 
 

4th-century writers
Pseudepigraphy